Mortagne-au-Perche is a commune in the Orne department in Normandy, north-western France.

Heraldry

Population

People
Geoffrey II, Count of Perche and Mortagne, grandfather of Queen Margaret of L'Aigle.
 Marie of Armagnac, duchess of Alençon, died there in 1473.
 Early Québécois settler Zacharie Cloutier (1590-1677).
 Jean-Pierre Poisson (1590-1650), an arquebusier who accompanied the explorer Champlain to Canada. Poisson returned to France, but some of his children emigrated to Quebec and left many descendants.
 City of Boucherville founder Pierre Boucher (1622-1717).
 Count Joseph de Puisaye (1755-1827), born in Mortagne-au-Perche, was the representative of the percheronne nobility in the Généraux States of Versailles of 1789. He rocks in the Counter-revolution after the arrest of the king and joined Chouannerie in Brittany. He was chosen by the Count d'Artois (future Charles X) to organize the English unloading of Quiberon in 1795 whose failure signs the end of his participation in the movement.  He died exiled in Hammersmith, England.
 Philosopher and antimilitarist Émile Chartier dit Alain (1868-1951), born in Mortagne-au-Perche.
 Fashion designer Chantal Thomass lives in Mortagne-au-Perche.
 Colonizer of Canada Pierre François de Rigaud, Marquis de Vaudreuil-Cavagnal.
 Journalist Jean Planchais (1922-2006), born in Mortagne-au-Perche.
 Journalist and Swiss writer Alex Capus, born in Mortagne-au-Perche in 1961.
 Writer and music scholar Jean-Pierre Grivois, born in Mortagne-au-Perche.

See also
Communes of the Orne department
 Perche

References

Communes of Orne
Subprefectures in France
Perche